Ardfert railway station served the village of Ardfert in County Kerry, Ireland.

The station opened on 20 December 1880. Passenger services were withdrawn on 4 February 1963, although the route through Ardfert continued to be used by freight trains for a while before the line to Listowel was finally closed altogether in 1977 and then to Tralee 1978. The station closed on 6 February 1978.

References 

Disused railway stations in County Kerry
Railway stations opened in 1880
Railway stations closed in 1963
1880 establishments in Ireland
1978 disestablishments in Ireland
Railway stations in the Republic of Ireland opened in the 19th century